This is a list of Danish television related events from 2013.

Events
26 January – Emmelie de Forest is selected to represent Denmark at the 2013 Eurovision Song Contest with her song "Only Teardrops". She is selected to be the forty-first Danish Eurovision entry during Dansk Melodi Grand Prix held at the Jyske Bank Boxen in Herning.
22 March – Chresten Falck Damborg wins the sixth season of X Factor.
16 May – Bjørn Clausen wins the fifth season of Big Brother.
18 May – Denmark wins the 58th Eurovision Song Contest in Malmö, Sweden. The winning song is "Only Teardrops", performed by Emmelie de Forest.
29 November – Table tennis player Mie Skov and her partner Mads Vad win the tenth season of Vild med dans.

Debuts

Television shows

1990s
Hvem vil være millionær? (1999–present)

2000s
Big Brother (2001–2005, 2012–2014)
Vild med dans (2005–present)
X Factor (2008–present)

2010s
Voice – Danmarks største stemme (2011–present)

Ending this year

Births

Deaths

See also
 2013 in Denmark